(Benzene)chromium tricarbonyl is an organometallic compound with the formula .   This yellow crystalline  solid compound is soluble in common nonpolar organic solvents. The molecule adopts a geometry known as “piano stool” because of the planar arrangement of the aryl group and the presence of three CO ligands as "legs" on the chromium-bond axis.

Preparation
(Benzene)tricarbonylchromium was first reported in 1957 by Fischer and Öfele, who prepared the compound by the carbonylation of bis(benzene)chromium. They obtained mainly chromium carbonyl (Cr(CO)) and traces of Cr(CH)(CO). The synthesis was optimized through the reaction of Cr(CO) and Cr(CH).  For commercial purposes, a reaction of Cr(CO) and benzene is used:
Cr(CO)  +  CH   →   Cr(CH)(CO)  +  3 CO

Applications
Complexes of the type (Arene)Cr(CO)3 have been well investigated as reagents in organic synthesis.. The aromatic ring of (benzene)tricarbonylchromium is substantially more electrophilic than benzene itself, allowing it to undergo nucleophilic addition reactions.

It is also more acidic, undergoing lithiation upon treatment with n-butyllithium.  The resulting organolithium compound can then be used as a nucleophile in various reactions, for example, with trimethylsilyl chloride:

(Benzene)tricarbonylchromium is a useful catalyst for the hydrogenation of 1,3-dienes.  The product alkene results from 1,4-addition of hydrogen.  The complex does not hydrogenate isolated double bonds.

References 

Half sandwich compounds
Organochromium compounds
Carbonyl complexes